Elinnette Rodríguez Calderín (Yauco, Puerto Rico, October 14, 1994), with stage name Eli Fantasy, is a Puerto Rican urban singer and model. Eliennette represented her native Yauco at the Miss Universe Puerto Rico pageant in 2015 where she won the Miss Amistad award.

In 2016, she transitioned to the world of exotic dance to the music industry. Her musical career began with a video entitled La Peseta, characterized by its humorous content, urban rhythm and the colorful presence that Eli Fantasy possesses.

As a result of her popularity, in 2017 she released her second single "No soy como tu" and "Noche Inolvidable". At the end of 2017 she recorded "Desquitarnos Bailando".

In 2019 Eli Fantasy signed with Interscope Records, releasing the first single under the label titled; Si toca toca on 2020.

She was arrested in the state of Florida (USA) in May 2022. At the moment, Eli Fantasy is being held in a penitentiary institution and could face 8 years in prison.

Singles

 La Peseta - 2017
 No soy como tú - 2018
 Noche Inolvidable- 2018
 Más perra que yo - 2018
 Desquitarnos bailando (2018) 
  Braty Puti - 2019 (feat. Tomasa del Real)
 Si Toca Toca - 2020,

References

External links
 

1994 births
Living people
People from Yauco, Puerto Rico
21st-century Puerto Rican women singers